Aspudden metro station is a station on Line 13 in the Stockholm metro, located in the district of Aspudden. The station was opened on 5 April 1964 as part of the first stretch of Metro 2, between T-Centralen and Örnsberg, with a branch to Fruängen.

References

Red line (Stockholm metro) stations
Railway stations opened in 1964